Benjamin Goodfellow (12 January 1864 – 11 June 1946) was a British solicitor and philatelist who signed the Roll of Distinguished Philatelists in 1923.

Goodfellow was a specialist in the stamps of Persia, Prince Edward Island, New Zealand and Norway. He translated the work of Justus Anderssen on the stamps of Norway.

References

Signatories to the Roll of Distinguished Philatelists
British philatelists
British solicitors
1864 births
1946 deaths